LTN Family is a 24-hour Urdu General Entertainment channel owned by Leo Television Network, which is based in Lahore, Pakistan. It broadcasts local and different multinational shows including Turkish and Korean content. The channel began its transmission on April 19, 2019.

Current Programmes

Children's block
Fix And Foxy
Masha And The Bear
Ninja Hattori
Grizzy And The Lemmings
Superheroes
Barbie Dreamhouse Adventures

Dramas
 Agar Tum Mere Hote
 Thori Si Wafa
 Zameer
 Talaash
 Anjaam
 Pehchaan
 Sandy Mandy
 Pyaar Lafzon Mein Kahan

Shows
 The Zain Ul Abadin Show

Former Programs

Original

Comedy
 Sandy Mandy

Dramas
 Ajnabi Lage Zindagi
Barish Main Aag
Emaan
Ishq Zaat
Maahi
Mujhe Rang De
Tum Saath Nibha Letay Agar
Yeh Meri Zindagi

Acquired

Indian
Beyhadh
 Chandrakanta 
Dil Se Dil Tak 
Ek Deewaana Tha 
Kasam Tere Pyaar Ki 
Ishq Mein Marjawan 
May I Come In! Madam
Meri Aashiqui Tumse Hi 
Naagin 
 Roop - Mard Ka Naya Swaroop

Korean 
Tum Hi Ho (Korean)

Turkish
Armaan
Pyaar Lafzon Mein Kahan

Russian
 Ishq Aatish
 Katherine

Films

Production House 
Leo Television Network Production

See also 
 List of Pakistani television stations

References 

Lollywood
Television stations in Pakistan
Television channels and stations established in 2004
Television networks in Pakistan
Movie channels in Pakistan